Florida Tropics SC is a professional soccer club based in Lakeland, Florida. They are owned by Central Florida Sports Ventures, LLC, led by Dr. Panos Iakovidis, and former USL commissioner and Rochester Rhinos owner Chris Economides. The organization was originally founded in 2015 as a team in the Major Arena Soccer League before expanding into other leagues.

The Tropics organization operates three senior teams across two different leagues. The first team is Florida Tropics SC, which plays in the professional Major Arena Soccer League. The club also fields two men's outdoor teams. The top outdoor is Tropics SC, which plays in the United Premier Soccer League First Division. There is also a Tropics Reserves team playing the UPSL's Second Division.

The club previously fielded a USL League Two team known as the Lakeland Tropics, and a Women's Premier Soccer League team.

In addition to the senior squads, the Tropics organization also oversees two youth clubs in Central Florida. Lakeland Tropics FC in Lakeland, and Celebration FC Tropics in Celebration.

History
On May 3, 2016, the Tropics, in conjunction with the newly formed IPL, held a press conference at the RP Funding Center and stated they would be joining the IPL alongside the Baltimore Blast, Harrisburg Heat, and St. Louis Ambush.  However, on August 29, 2016, it was announced that all IPL teams including Florida would be joining the MASL. The team finished 3rd in their division in their inaugural season, and averaged over 2,500 fans a game including one sell out. In their second season in the MASL, the Tropics again fell just short of the playoffs, finishing 3rd in the Eastern Division. It was in 2017 that the club fielded their first USL League Two franchise, and in 2019 a new squad was created to play in the UPSL Pro Premier Florida Division, who went on to win the leagues national championship. The official supporter group of the Tropics organization is the Swan City Syndicate.

The Tropics succeed the Tampa Bay area as the local indoor soccer club. The team is unrelated to the original Tampa Bay Rowdies, who were notorious for their indoor soccer success, as well as their outdoor. A current Rowdies team began to play in 2010 and is also unrelated to that club; the team exclusively plays outdoor soccer. Indoor soccer by the original Rowdies had officially ended when the team played in the American Indoor Soccer Association for one season (1986–87). For two seasons, another Tampa Bay area team played in the same league, from 1995 to 1997, called the Tampa Bay Terror; however, the team did not last more than two seasons, despite having some members of the Rowdies on the roster. It would not be until the Tropics first season that indoor soccer would return to the area.

Personnel

2022–23 roster

Active players
As of December 28, 2022

Inactive players

Staff
  Clay Roberts –  Head coach, (2016–present)
  Kevin Curtin –  Assistant coach, (2022–present)
  Nick Olgee - Trainer, (2021–present)
  Dr. Panos Iakovidis - Team owner, (2017–present)

Notable players
  Rodrigo Fernandes Alflen – MASL
  Robbie Aristodemo - MASL
  Marko Bedenikovic – MASL
  Christian Blandon – MASL
  Lucas Coutinho – MASL & PDL
  Gordy Gurson – MASL
  Daniel Mendes – MASL
  Pascal Millien – UPSL
  David Paul – MASL
  Tosan Popo – MASL
  Victor Rojas - MASL & PDL
  Raheem Taylor-Parkes – PDL/League Two
  Juan Tejada – PDL

Venues
 RP Funding Center, Lakeland (MASL; 2016–present)
 Bryant Stadium, Lakeland (USL2 & WPSL; 2017–2019)
 St. Petersburg High School Stadium, St. Petersburg (WPSL; 2018)
 Lake Myrtle Sports Complex, Auburndale (UPSL & USOC; 2019–present)
 Tournament Sportsplex of Tampa Bay, Tampa (WPSL; 2019)
 Premier Sports Complex, Lakewood Ranch (WPSL; 2019)

References

External links
Official website - MASL team
Official website - PDL team

 
Major Arena Soccer League teams
Sports in Lakeland, Florida
Indoor soccer clubs in the United States
Soccer clubs in Florida
2016 establishments in Florida
Association football clubs established in 2016
Sports in Polk County, Florida
Tropics SC
Women's Premier Soccer League teams
Sports in St. Petersburg, Florida
Sports in Manatee County, Florida